Telmosena is a genus of minute, salt-tolerant snails with an operculum, aquatic gastropod mollusks, or micromollusks, in the subfamily Omphalotropidinae  of the family Assimineidae.

Species
 Telmosena suteri (Sykes, 1900)

References

 Bank, R. A. (2017). Classification of the Recent freshwater/brackish Gastropoda of the World. Last update: January 24th, 2018.

Assimineidae
Gastropod genera